Isle of Flowers is a 1989 Brazilian short film by Jorge Furtado. It tracks the path of a tomato from grower to the child who collects it as food from a dump with the help of voiceover and a collection of illustrative images. The director stated the film was inspired by the works of Kurt Vonnegut and Alain Resnais, among others.

In 1995, Isle of Flowers was chosen by the European critics as one of the 100 most important short films of the century.

Plot
A constant and verbose off-camera narrator guides the viewer through the life of a tomato. Beginning at Mr Suzuki's tomato field, the tomato is then sold to a supermarket, where it is acquired by Mrs Anete, a perfume salesperson, together with some pork. Each exchange requires the presence of money, which is, together with the tomato, the constant element in the story.

Mrs Anete intends to prepare a tomato sauce for the pork, but, having considered one of Mr Suzuki's tomatoes inadequate, she throws it in the garbage. Together with the rest of the garbage, the tomato is taken to Isle of Flowers (Ilha das Flores), Porto Alegre's landfill. There, the organic material considered adequate is selected as food for pigs. The rest, which is considered inadequate for the pigs, is given to poor women and children to eat.

Cast
Paulo José as narrator
Ciça Reckziegel as Dona Anete
Luciana Azevedo as Ana Luizia Nunes
Irene Schmidt as the client
Takahiro Suzuki as Sr. Suzuki

Production 

The scene of the perfume factory was actually shot in a high school laboratory (Colégio Anchieta).

Reception

Public 
Since its release, Isle of Flowers has become one of the most acclaimed pseudo-documentary short films of all time. For a number of years, users of the Internet Movie Database voted it the best Brazilian short film and documentary film ever made.

Awards 
Isle of Flowers was very well received by film festivals all over the world when first released. It won a Silver Bear for Best Short Feature at the 1990 Berlin Film Festival as well as nine awards at the 1989 Gramado Film Festival, including for Best Short Film.

References

External links
 
 Isle of Flowers, part 1, streamed video with audio in English, on YouTube
   DailyMotion'' (streamed video)
  Script of the film

1989 documentary films
1980s short documentary films
1989 short films
1989 films
Anti-modernist films
Brazilian short documentary films
Films shot in Porto Alegre
Anti-capitalism
Films directed by Jorge Furtado
Brazilian satirical films
1980s satirical films
1980s Portuguese-language films